Copiague Harbor is an affluent incorporated community in the hamlet of Copiague. It is located south of Merrick Road (or Montauk Highway), off of South Great Neck Road in Suffolk County, New York, USA, on the South Shore of Long Island.  It is sometimes referred to as Great Neck Landing.

Description 
Copiague Harbor is a small community located on a southern peninsula of Copiague, primarily composed of larger size homes deeded belonging to a homeowners' association, Great South Bay Estates Homeowner's Association (GSBEHA). The community offers amenities including a mini-beach and mini-marina on a private lagoon.

It was developed in the 1960s intended as a private community, gated and guarded. From time to time residents have considered adding a gate and guard as originally intended.

Geography
Copiague Harbor is located at the southernmost part of the hamlet of Copiague. It borders the Great South Bay.

Education

School District 
Copiague Harbor is located within the boundaries of (and is thus served by) the Copiague Union Free School District. As such, all children who reside within Copiague Harbor and attend public schools attend Copiague's schools.

Library District 
Copiague Harbor is located within the boundaries of (and is thus served by) the Copiague Library District.

References 
Babylon (town), New York
Populated coastal places in New York (state)

External links 

 Official website